Roxana is an unincorporated community located in Letcher County, Kentucky, United States.  It lies at the intersection of KY 588 and KY 160 on the North Fork of the Kentucky River near its confluence with Kings Creek.

References

Unincorporated communities in Letcher County, Kentucky
Unincorporated communities in Kentucky